Hilders is a municipality in the district of Fulda, in Hesse, Germany. To the north rises the mountain of Auersberg.

References

Municipalities in Hesse
Fulda (district)